

The Balsam Mountain Inn is an historic wooden Neo-Classical and Victorian hotel located at 68 Seven Springs Drive in Balsam, North Carolina, United States. In July, 1982, it was added to the National Register of Historic Places.

Construction of the inn began in 1905 and was completed in 1908.  The Inn began as a railroad resort hotel, one of many in the area.  Now, the Balsam Mountain Inn is the last one standing in Balsam.

The inn was bought in 1990 by Merrily Teasley, an experienced innkeeper from Tennessee.  She restored the Inn, with the historic preservation certified by the U.S. Department of Interior.  She even built an addition that serves as a dining porch that won the Gertrude S. Carraway Award of Merit from Preservation North Carolina in 1995.    In 2011, Merrily returned to manage the inn.

On December 1, 2017, the Balsam Mountain Inn was purchased by Marzena B. Wyszynska, an international hotelier and entrepreneur most recently from the Raleigh area. Wyszynska purchased the inn from Merrily Teasley, whose 1990 restoration rescued one of the few remaining structures of its type in the region, and will continue to operate the business as an inn, arts space and events center.

See also
National Register of Historic Places listings in Jackson County, North Carolina

References

Hotel buildings on the National Register of Historic Places in North Carolina
Colonial Revival architecture in North Carolina
Hotel buildings completed in 1908
Buildings and structures in Jackson County, North Carolina
Railway hotels in the United States
1908 establishments in North Carolina
National Register of Historic Places in Jackson County, North Carolina